Timmy Fleming (born 1969 in Killorglin, County Kerry) is an Irish former sportsman. He played Gaelic football with his local club Laune Rangers and was a member of the Kerry senior inter-county team between 1989 and 1994.

References

 

1969 births
Living people
Laune Rangers Gaelic footballers
Kerry inter-county Gaelic footballers
Munster inter-provincial Gaelic footballers